Usos or USOS or variation, may refer to:

 United States Orbital Segment (USOS), the portion of the International Space Station using U.S. NASA design specifications
 The Usos, a pro-wrestling tag team
 United States Oceanographic Survey (U.S.O.S.), the fictional ship prefix from the Voyage to the Bottom of the Sea science fiction franchise, as found on the USOS Seaview

See also

 Usos y costumbres (Latin America)
 
 USO (disambiguation), for the singular